Salic may refer to:

Salian Franks, one of the division of the Franks
Salic law, a Frankish law code
Salian dynasty, medieval German dynasty of Frankish descent
Sial, a class of igneous rock